Gu Haiyan (born 29 September 1999) is a Chinese wheelchair fencer. She won the gold medal in the women's foil A event at the 2020 Summer Paralympics held in Tokyo, Japan. She also won the gold medal in the women's team foil event.

At the 2019 IWAS Wheelchair Fencing World Championships held in Cheongju, South Korea, she won the gold medal in the women's team sabre event.

References 

Living people
1999 births
Place of birth missing (living people)
Chinese female fencers
Wheelchair fencers at the 2020 Summer Paralympics
Medalists at the 2020 Summer Paralympics
Paralympic gold medalists for China
Paralympic medalists in wheelchair fencing
Paralympic wheelchair fencers of China
21st-century Chinese women